Uruguayan Ecuadorians are people born in Uruguay who live in Ecuador, or Ecuadorian-born people of Uruguayan descent. 

Many Uruguayan-born persons live in Ecuador, for a number of reasons. Both countries share the Spanish language; the historical origins of both nations is common (part of the Spanish Empire until the early 19th century).

Uruguayan-style pizza and asado can be found on selected places in Ecuador.

Notable people
 Daniel Fascioli, footballer
 Marcelo Fleitas, footballer
 Marcelo Velazco, footballer
 Oscar Zubía, football player and manager

See also
Ecuador–Uruguay relations
Emigration from Uruguay

References

Ethnic groups in Ecuador
 
Ecuador